Ishimbaysky District is an administrative and municipal district (raion), one of the fifty-four in the Republic of Bashkortostan, Russia. It is located in the southern central part of the republic and borders with Gafuriysky District in the north, Beloretsky District in the northeast, Burzyansky District in the east and southeast, Meleuzovsky District in the south, and with Sterlitamaksky District in the west. Its administrative center is the town of Ishimbay (which is not administratively a part of the district). As of the 2010 Census, the total population of the district was 25,042.

History
The district was established on March 20, 1937.

Administrative and municipal status
Within the framework of administrative divisions, Ishimbaysky District is one of the fifty-four in the Republic of Bashkortostan. It is divided into thirteen selsoviets, comprising eighty-six rural localities. The town of Ishimbay serves as its administrative center, despite being incorporated separately as a town of republic significance—an administrative unit with the status equal to that of the districts.

As a municipal division, the district is incorporated as Ishimbaysky Municipal District, with the town of republic significance of Ishimbay being incorporated within it as Ishimbay Urban Settlement. Its thirteen selsoviets are incorporated as thirteen rural settlements within the municipal district. The town of Ishimbay serves as the administrative center of the municipal district as well.

Villages and localities
 

Safartuy

Gallery

References

Notes

Sources

 
Districts of Bashkortostan
States and territories established in 1937